The 1971 Maryland Terrapins football team represented the University of Maryland in the 1971 NCAA University Division football season. In their third season under head coach Roy Lester, the Terrapins compiled a 2–9 record (1–5 in conference), finished in last place in the Atlantic Coast Conference, and were outscored by their opponents 283 to 224. The team's statistical leaders included Al Neville with 1,275 passing yards, Monte Hinkle with 457 rushing yards, and Dan Bungori with 490 receiving yards.

Schedule

Roster

References

Maryland
Maryland Terrapins football seasons
Maryland Terrapins football